Road to Ruin is a 1991 romantic comedy, directed by Charlotte Brandström

Plot
Peter Weller plays a wealthy American businessman living in Paris who falls in love with a fashion model  (Carey Lowell) and decides to test her love by giving up his fortune.

External links

1991 romantic comedy films
1991 films
American romantic comedy films
French romantic comedy films